Ibex are various mountain goat species.

Ibex, or IBEX, may also refer to:

Places 
 Ibex, Kentucky, United States
 Ibex Valley, Canada

Transport 
 Interstellar Boundary Explorer (IBEX), a spacecraft
 Ibex (vehicle), a 4WD/SUV car
 Ibex Airlines, Japan

Other uses
 IBEX (surveillance), United States–Iranian project to build observation and listening posts in Iran
 IBEX 35, Spanish market stock index 
 IBEX, the Instituto de Biologia do Exercito (“Institute of Biology of the Brazilian Army”)
 Ibex Outdoor Clothing
 Ibex (band) (also known as Wreckage), a late 1960s band notable for featuring future Queen vocalist Freddie Mercury
 Ibex (company), American company

See also 
 Intrepid Ibex, code name for Ubuntu 8.10 operating system
 Ibis (disambiguation)